First Kiss may refer to:

Art
L'Amour et Psyché, enfants, incorrectly called Le premier baiser

Film, TV and entertainment
The First Kiss (1928 American film), a 1928 American silent film starring Fay Wray and Gary Cooper
The First Kiss (1928 German film), a 1928 German silent comedy film
The First Kiss (1954 film), a 1954 West German comedy film
First Kiss (1998 film), 1998 South Korea film directed by Kim Tae-kyun
First Kiss (2012 film), 2012 film starring Brenda Song
First Kiss (2014 film), a 2014 American short film
First Kiss (TV series), a 2007 Japanese television drama series
First Kiss Story, visual romance novel
First Kiss Story II, visual romance novel
"First Kiss (On The Lips, That Is)", an episode of The Naked Brothers Band

Music
First Kiss (Aya Matsuura album), 2002
First Kiss (Kid Rock album), 2015
"First Kiss" (song), 2015
First Kiss, a 1997 album by Richard Smith
"First Kiss", a song by Sphere3 from the album Comeuppance
"First Kiss", a song by i5 from the soundtrack to Center Stage
"First Kiss", a song by Ryan O'Shaughnessy
"First Kiss", a song by Yo Yo Honey Singh

Other
First Kiss (apple), also known as rave and MN55, an apple cultivar developed in Minnesota